Andrej Preston (born c. 1986), also known under the pseudonym  (meaning "little elephant" in Slovene), is the founder of the former BitTorrent site Suprnova.org.

The Slovenian publication Mladina revealed in November 2004 that he was 18 years old and a student at the Waldorf High School in Ljubljana, Slovenia. After having shut down Suprnova.org in December 2004, he became the target of a police investigation in early 2005, and his two computers were confiscated. In October 2005 the prosecutor announced that no charges would be filed and the computers were returned.

Andrej Preston had given the domain name suprnova.org to The Pirate Bay. The Pirate Bay had relaunched it as of August 21, 2007.

On August 25, 2007, he moved to San Francisco, California, where he is visiting Academy of Art University.

Three years after donating the suprnova.org domain to The Pirate Bay, Preston retrieved it, in order to make a new website, which should become an online video portal.

References

External links 
  – Andrej Preston's blog describing his experience after he moved to the United States

Living people
Waldorf school alumni
1986 births
Slovenian Internet celebrities
BitTorrent
People from Ljubljana
Academy of Art University alumni